John Barrett III (born 1947) is an American politician serving as a Democratic member of the Massachusetts House of Representatives. He was elected to the post on November 7, 2017, filling the vacant seat previously held by Gailanne Cariddi, who had died of cancer in June 2017. He represents the furthest northwest district in the state, the 1st Berkshire district. Barrett serves on three committees in the chamber: the Joint Committee on Marijuana Policy, the Joint Committee on Health Care Financing, and the Joint Committee on Election Laws. Barrett was reelected to the House of Representatives in 2018.

Barrett previously served as the mayor of North Adams for twenty-six years, from 1984 to 2009, making him at the time the longest-serving mayor in the state.  As mayor, he was noted for his efforts to revive the city's economy after the closure of a leading employer, Sprague Electric, and as a supporter of the Massachusetts Museum of Contemporary Art, which opened in the former Sprague facility in 1999.  In his 2009 bid for a fourteenth term, he was defeated by council member Dick Alcombright.  He won a term on the city council in 2011, then lost to Alcombright in another run for mayor in 2015.

He attended North Adams State College, now known as Massachusetts College of Liberal Arts (MCLA), where he received bachelor's and master's degrees as well as an honorary doctor of public service degree and the distinguished alumni award, and in 2016 he was named to MCLA's board of trustees.

See also
 2019–2020 Massachusetts legislature
 2021–2022 Massachusetts legislature

References

1947 births
Living people
Massachusetts College of Liberal Arts alumni
Massachusetts city council members
Democratic Party members of the Massachusetts House of Representatives
People from North Adams, Massachusetts
21st-century American politicians